The 1966 Railway Cup Hurling Championship was the 40th staging of the Railway Cup since its establishment by the Gaelic Athletic Association in 1927. The cup began on 28 February 1966 and ended on 17 March 1966.

Leinster were the defending champions.

On 17 March 1966, Munster won the cup following a 3-13 to 3-11 defeat of Leinster in the final. This was their 28th Railway Cup title and their first since 1963.

Munster's Frankie Walsh was the top scorer with 2-07.

Results

Semi-finals

Final

Statistics

Top scorers overall

Top scorers in a single game

Bibliography

 Donegan, Des, The Complete Handbook of Gaelic Games (DBA Publications Limited, 2005).

References

Railway Cup Hurling Championship
1966 in hurling